Shebbear is a village and civil parish in the Torridge district in Devon, England. It was once itself centre of the Shebbear hundred. In 2001 the parish had a population of 858. An electoral ward exists titled Shebbear and Langtree. The 2011 census population was 1,016.

John Wesley laid hands on a young Cornishman called William O’Bryan who later founded the Bible Christian Church in Shebbear: the first Bryanite chapel was built in the village in 1817.

Church
The church of St Michael and All Angels dates back to the 11th century. The south doorway is from about 1180.

Shebbear College
Shebbear College is a coeducational day and boarding public school for children from 3 to 18 years of age. Notable Old Boys include: Sir Pridham Baulkwill, Sir Ivan Stedeford and E. W. Martin.

Turning the Devil's Stone
At 8 pm on 5 November each year, while the rest of the country is burning an effigy of Guy Fawkes, Shebbear has its own unique celebration. The one tonne lump of rock known as the Devil's Stone (or Devil's Boulder), which lies in the village square, is turned over by the village bellringers. The stone is a glacial erratic - not from a local rock formation. According to local tradition the stone needs to be turned over every year or a disaster will fall on the village - the last year it was not turned on 5 November was during the Second World War when such frivolity was frowned on, but after a few days of bad news someone flipped it over anyway. Supposedly the Devil dropped the stone while fighting with God, he lost the battle. Consequently, the stone fell on top of him, flattening him under it. The folklore reasoning for the turning is that it takes a year for the Devil to dig down and up the other side of the rock, at which point it is flipped again, re-trapping him.

Shebbear Community School
Shebbear Community School is a state school for children from 4 to 11 years of age. It is located in the middle of Shebbear, next to the local park.

Twin towns
Balleroy, France.

References

External links

Villages in Devon
Torridge District